Flavonoids are synthesized by the phenylpropanoid metabolic pathway in which the amino acid phenylalanine is used to produce 4-coumaroyl-CoA. This  can be combined with malonyl-CoA to yield the true backbone of flavonoids, a group of compounds  called chalcones, which contain two phenyl rings. Conjugate ring-closure of chalcones results in the familiar form of flavonoids, the three-ringed structure of a flavone. The metabolic pathway continues through a series of enzymatic modifications to yield flavanones → dihydroflavonols → anthocyanins. Along this pathway, many products can be formed, including the flavonols, flavan-3-ols, proanthocyanidins (tannins) and a host of other various polyphenolics.

Flavanoids can possess chiral carbons. Methods of analysis should take this element into account especially regarding bioactivity or enzyme stereospecificity.

Enzymes 
The biosynthesis of flavonoids involves several enzymes.

 Anthocyanidin reductase
 Chalcone isomerase
 Dihydrokaempferol 4-reductase
 Flavone synthase
 Flavonoid 3'-monooxygenase
 Flavonol synthase
 Flavanone 3-dioxygenase
 Flavanone 4-reductase
 Leucoanthocyanidin reductase
 Leucocyanidin oxygenase
 Naringenin-chalcone synthase

Methylation 
 Apigenin 4'-O-methyltransferase
 Luteolin O-methyltransferase
 Quercetin 3-O-methyltransferase

Glycosylation 
 Anthocyanidin 3-O-glucosyltransferase
 Flavone 7-O-beta-glucosyltransferase
 Flavone apiosyltransferase
 Flavonol-3-O-glucoside L-rhamnosyltransferase
 Flavonol 3-O-glucosyltransferase

Further acetylations 
 Isoflavone-7-O-beta-glucoside 6"-O-malonyltransferase

References 

Flavonoids metabolism
Biosynthesis